Konidela Varun Tej (born 19 January 1990) is an Indian actor who works in Telugu films. Born to the Allu–Konidela family, he is the son of actor Nagendra Babu. Till date he has starred in 13 films.

Tej made his acting debut in 2014 with Mukunda. It was a box-office flop like his next three releases, though he received praise for featuring in Krish's critically acclaimed war film Kanche (2015). He established himself as a leading actor with the romantic drama Fidaa (2017), a major critical and commercial success. Tej has since starred in films including Tholi Prema (2018), Gaddalakonda Ganesh (2019), F2 (2019) and F3 (2022).

Early life 
Varun Tej is the son of Telugu actor and producer Nagendra Babu. He is a nephew of actors Chiranjeevi and Pawan Kalyan. His younger sister Niharika is also an actress. Actors Ram Charan, Allu Arjun, Allu Sirish, Sai Tej and Panja Vaisshnav Tej are his cousins. He was educated at Bharatiya Vidya Bhavan, Jubilee Hills, Hyderabad, and at St. Mary's College, Hyderabad.

Career 
Tej debuted as a child artist in his father Nagendra Babu's film Hands Up! when he was just ten years old. He made his adult debut with Mukunda, starring opposite fellow newcomer Pooja Hegde. The film earned mixed reviews. His second venture was the 2015 war film Kanche, starring opposite Pragya Jaiswal and received positive reviews from critics.  Tej's performance as Dhupati Haribabu was praised with The Times of India praising his "capability to shift gears from intense to sobriety". His second release that year Loafer, was a box office failure, along with his 2017 outing Mister.

The later half of 2017 saw the release of Fidaa, where he played an NRI falling in love with a village belle. The film was commercially successful grossing over 90 crore at the box office. His 2018 release Tholi Prema was also a box office success and Tej's performance as an impulsive young man was widely appreciated. His next film that year was space thriller Antariksham 9000 KMPH, directed by Sankalp Reddy.

In 2019, Tej's first release was F2: Fun and Frustration which is a multistarrer with Venkatesh, Tamannaah and Mehreen Pirzada are also a part of this movie which is huge blockbuster. After F2, he dubbed in Telugu for Aladdin's role in the film Aladdin. He later starred in Gaddalakonda Ganesh, a remake of Tamil film Jigarthanda, directed by Harish Shankar which was successful at the box office.

As of January 2020, Tej has two films under production, Ghani, and F2's sequel F3. Tej is playing the role of a boxer, in Ghani directed by Kiran Korrapati.

Filmography

TV shows

Awards and nominations

References

External links 

 

Living people
Indian male film actors
Male actors from Hyderabad, India
Male actors in Telugu cinema
21st-century Indian male actors
1990 births
Indian male voice actors